Maloyaz (Malayaź) is a rural locality (a selo) and the administrative center of Salavatsky District in the Republic of Bashkortostan, Russia, located on the Yuryuzan River. Population:

References

Rural localities in Salavatsky District